Atherinopsis californiensis, the jack silverside or jacksmelt, is a species of neotropical silverside native to the Pacific coast of North America from Oregon, United States to southern Baja California, Mexico. It is the only known member of its genus. The adults occur in inshore areas, such as bays. They form schools. This species is a demersal spawners in inshore habitats, it is oviparous and the larvae are planktonic, living at the very surface of the water and feeding on phytoplankton. The eggs are attached to one another and to the substrate by adhesive filaments in the chorion.

Other common names
California smelt, blue smelt, horse smelt, peixe rey, pescado del rey, pesce rey, silverside

References

External links

Atherinopsidae
Monotypic fish genera
Fish described in 1854